Allothereua caeruleata is a species of centipede in the Scutigeridae family. It is endemic to Australia. It was first described in 1925 by German myriapodologist Karl Wilhelm Verhoeff.

Distribution
The species occurs in South Australia. The type locality is Adelaide.

Behaviour
The centipedes are solitary terrestrial predators that inhabit plant litter and soil.

References

 

 
caeruleata
Centipedes of Australia
Endemic fauna of Australia
Fauna of South Australia
Animals described in 1925
Taxa named by Karl Wilhelm Verhoeff